Alejandro Castillo Castillo (born 15 July 1987) is a Mexican footballer who plays for Acapulco F.C. in the Liga de Balompié Mexicano.

He played for Acapulco of the Liga de Balompié Mexicano during the league's inaugural season in 2020–21, taking part in the first game in team history.

References

External links
 

1987 births
Living people
Footballers from Mexico City
Association football forwards
Club Necaxa footballers
Irapuato F.C. footballers
C.D. Veracruz footballers
Atlético San Luis footballers
Lobos BUAP footballers
Liga MX players
Ascenso MX players
Liga Premier de México players
Liga de Balompié Mexicano players
Mexican footballers